Jacques-Alexis Thuriot, known as Thuriot de la Rosière, and later as chevalier Thuriot de la Rosière, chevalier de l'Empire (1 May 1753 - 20 June 1829) was an important French statesman of the French Revolution, and a minor figure under the French Empire of Napoleon Bonaparte.

Early life and the French Revolution

Thuriot was born in Sézanne, Marne, France in 1753.  Admitted to the bar in Paris (1778), he practiced law at Reims before the outbreak of the Revolution in 1789. He took part in the events of 14 July 1789, acting as a negotiator on behalf of the revolutionaries, meeting with the governor of the Bastille just before the doomed fortress was stormed.  During the term of the National Assembly he was named a tribunal judge for the district of Sézanne (1790) and became a member of the Jacobin Club.

Elected to the Legislative Assembly (1791–1792) as a representative of the département of Marne.  The French monarchy was jeopardized as the year 1792 continued, and he was named deputy member of the Extraordinary Commission of Twelve (18 June 1792 - 21 September 1792) during this turbulent time.

Soon after Louis XVI was deposed, Thuriot was elected (3 September 1792) to the new National Convention (1792–1795) as a deputy, again for the département of Marne.  He voted for the death sentence in the trial of Louis XVI. He was one of the more radical members, on many occasions speaking against the Girondist faction, and even calling Maximilien Robespierre "moderate".  He served as Vice-President (9 April 1793 - 18 April 1793) and President (27 June 1793 - 11 July 1793), and was elected to the Committee of Public Safety (10 July 1793 - 20 September 1793).  He resigned from the committee shortly after the advent of the French Terror.

Thermidorean reaction

Thuriot was one of the bolder opponents of Maximilien Robespierre. Georges Lefebvre, a scholar of the French Revolution, counts him as a key ally of Danton, who had been executed by the machinations of Robespierre's Committee of Public Safety 5 April 1794.  During the Festival of the Supreme Being (8 June 1794), over which Robespierre presided, Thuriot said of him, “Look at the bugger; it’s not enough for him to be master, he has to be God.” He chaired the Convention in absence of then-president Jean-Marie Collot d'Herbois, during the fateful session on 9 Thermidor, Year II (27 July 1794), and by refusing to allow Robespierre to make a speech, he sealed the fate of the robespierrist faction.

In the days immediately following Thermidor he was elected president of the Jacobin Club (5 August 1794 - 24 August 1794) and exercised an important restraining influence on one of France's most radical bodies. He was among those who replaced the purged members of the Committee of Public Safety, and in this, his second term, he served 31 July 1794 - 5 December 1794.

He soon turned against the new political order, disgruntled by the abandonment of the Constitution of 1793 and the rehabilitation of the Girondists.  Thuriot's name was included among the many arrests that were ordered (5 April 1795) in the wake of the Germinal Insurrection of Year III, as he is accused of preparing the Jacobin insurrection against the convention, but he eluded capture. A second order of arrest was issued (21 May 1795) after the even more violent Prairial Insurrection, and this time a large force was dispatched into the faubourgs to find where Thuriot was in hiding with Pierre-Joseph Cambon, but once again he escaped and went into hiding until the amnesty of 26 October 1795, which signalled the end of the National Convention and the Thermidorean Reaction

Later career

Thuriot was appointed (14 November 1796) a commissioner to the civil and criminal tribunals of Marne.  He also served as deputy judge and judge in the criminal tribunal of Seine; During the French Empire he assumed positions in the imperial court of appeals, and Bonaparte named him chevalier Thuriot de la Rosière, chevalier de l'Empire 16 May 1813.  At the French Restoration he was banished as a regicide (1816) and died in exile in Liège, Kingdom of the Netherlands (now in Belgium).

References

French politicians
1753 births
1829 deaths
People of the French Revolution
Knights of the First French Empire
People from Marne (department)
People on the Committee of Public Safety